Meura is a municipality in the district Saalfeld-Rudolstadt, in Thuringia, Germany.

It is the location of Europe's largest stud farm for Haflinger horses.

References

Saalfeld-Rudolstadt
Schwarzburg-Rudolstadt